is a 2007 Japanese action film directed by Yoshinori Kobayashi, follow up to the Japanese television drama Unfair, and still starring Ryoko Shinohara in the main role. It's a Die Hard-like movie, where the heroine, a police officer, must free her daughter trapped in a hospital taken by terrorists asking for a ransom. It was released on March 17, 2007 and followed by Unfair 2: The Answer in 2011 and Unfair: The End in 2015.

Cast
 Ryoko Shinohara – Natsumi Yukihira
 Kippei Shiina – Kuniaki Goto
 Hiroki Narimiya – Toda
 Sadao Abe – Yuji Kokubo
 Mari Hamada – Anna Hasumi
 Rosa Kato – Hiroko
 Mion Mukaichi – Mio
 Masaya Kato – Kaoru Mikami
 Ren Osugi – Assistant Director Irie
 Susumu Terajima – Tetsuo Yamazaki
 Yosuke Eguchi – Jin Saiki

References

External links
 

2007 films
2007 action films
2000s Japanese-language films
Films based on television series
Japanese action films
Tokyo Metropolitan Police Department in fiction
2000s Japanese films